Naticarius orientalis is a species of predatory sea snail, a marine gastropod mollusk in the family Naticidae, the moon snails.

References

External links
 World Register of Marine Species, World Marine Mollusca database: Naticarius orientalis (Gmelin, 1791)

Naticidae
Gastropods described in 1791
Taxa named by Johann Friedrich Gmelin